Bloomfield Township is a civil township of Missaukee County in the U.S. state of Michigan.  As of the 2010 census, the township population was 531.

Geography

The Manistee River flows through the northwest portion of the township.

Adjacent townships 

 Springfield Township, Kalkaska County (north)
 Garfield Township, Kalkaska County (northeast)
 Pioneer Township, Missaukee County (east)
 Forest Township, Missaukee County (southeast)
 Caldwell Township, Missaukee County (south)
 Cedar Creek Township, Wexford County (southwest)
 Liberty Township, Wexford County (west)
 Fife Lake Township, Grand Traverse County (northwest)

Major highway
 forms a very small boundary in the southeast corner of the township.

Demographics
As of the census of 2000, there were 475 people, 182 households, and 141 families residing in the township.  The population density was 13.3 per square mile (5.1/km2).  There were 329 housing units at an average density of 9.2 per square mile (3.6/km2).  The racial makeup of the township was 95.58% White, 0.63% African American, 0.21% Native American, 0.42% Asian, 0.63% from other races, and 2.53% from two or more races. Hispanic or Latino of any race were 2.95% of the population.

There were 182 households, out of which 29.7% had children under the age of 18 living with them, 69.2% were married couples living together, 3.8% had a female householder with no husband present, and 22.5% were non-families. 17.6% of all households were made up of individuals, and 6.0% had someone living alone who was 65 years of age or older.  The average household size was 2.61 and the average family size was 2.86.

In the township the population was spread out, with 25.1% under the age of 18, 6.9% from 18 to 24, 26.9% from 25 to 44, 29.1% from 45 to 64, and 12.0% who were 65 years of age or older.  The median age was 39 years. For every 100 females, there were 116.9 males.  For every 100 females age 18 and over, there were 110.7 males.

The median income for a household in the township was $37,500, and the median income for a family was $40,357. Males had a median income of $33,958 versus $19,375 for females. The per capita income for the township was $15,658.  About 6.8% of families and 12.9% of the population were below the poverty line, including 23.0% of those under age 18 and 3.2% of those age 65 or over.

References

Townships in Missaukee County, Michigan
Townships in Michigan
Populated places established in 1904
1904 establishments in Michigan